The 2000 Delaware Democratic presidential primary, was the third primary for the Democratic Party's nomination as its candidate for the 2000 presidential election, took place on February 5, 2000.

Candidates
Bill Bradley, former Senator from New Jersey
Al Gore, incumbent Vice President of the United States from Tennessee

Campaign
Due to its minor status in the primaries and the fact that it and Washington came in between the New Hampshire and California primaries, both major candidates only spent a small amount of time in both states.

2000 results

Al Gore won all of Delaware's 3 counties, but would not receive its 22 delegates (Gore would get fifteen with seven remaining unallocated) until the caucus that happened after Bill Bradley ended his campaign. Bill Bradley lost the rest of the primaries by large margins and Al Gore would eventually lose the general election to Governor of Texas George W. Bush.

References

See also
 2000 Democratic Party presidential primaries

2000
Delaware
Democratic primary